EU Tauri is a variable star in the equatorial constellation of Taurus. With a brightness that cycles around an apparent visual magnitude of 8.07, it is too faint to be visible to the naked eye. The distance to this star is approximately 3,900 light years based on parallax measurements, but it is drifting closer with a radial velocity of −2.5 km/s. The position of this star near the ecliptic means it is subject to lunar occultations.

The variability of this star was first reported by C. Hoffmeister in 1949, who later reported it as not variable. It was initially classified as an eclipsing binary of the W Ursae Majoris type by F. B. Wood and associates in 1963, based on observations by T. A. Azarnova in 1950-1951. Analysis of photoelectric data by E. F. Guinan in 1966 suggested this is instead a cepheid-type variable with a short pulsation period of about 2.105 days. He refined this period to 2.1051 days in 1972.

A study of the light curve of this and other cepheids in 1981 showed it belongs to a small group with unusually short periods and distinctive behavior. This indicated that EU Tauri may be a "first overtone" pulsator. Gieren and J. M. Matthews in 1987 suggested that the star may instead have two pulsation periods, but this was later refuted. The evidence now mostly supports the idea that the pulsation of the star is in a "radial first overtone mode". The 1% radius variation during a pulsation cycle is relatively small for a star of this class. By 2007, scattered observations over a 35 year time frame indicated that the pulsation period of this s-Cepheid may have changed.

References

Further reading

Cepheid variables

Taurus (constellation)
BD+18 955
038321
027183
Tauri, EU